Satu Järvelä (born 4 October 1977) is a Finnish snowboarder. 

She was born in Helsinki. She competed at the 1998 Winter Olympics, in women's halfpipe.

References

External links 
 

1977 births
Living people
Sportspeople from Helsinki
Finnish female snowboarders
Olympic snowboarders of Finland
Snowboarders at the 1998 Winter Olympics